Fat Boost is the third mini-album by punk rock band Bomb Factory.  It was released in December 2002 on Monstar/Limited, and contains six songs, plus one hidden track, which is an audio clip of someone vomiting.

Track listing
 All music and lyrics written by Bomb Factory.

"Awaited Time" – 4:00
"Roller Coaster" – 3:54
"Hangover" – 3:31
"23 Hours" – 3:29
"Worst Case" – 3:08
"Holiday" – 4:23
"A Meal to Puke" – 0:48

Personnel 

 Jun-ya - vocals
 Kazuya - guitar, vocals
 Joe - bass guitar, vocals
 Shira - drums, vocals

External links
Bomb Factory's official website

Bomb Factory (band) albums
2002 EPs